Emil Hansen can refer to:

 Emil Hansen (footballer)
 Emil Christian Hansen